The 2017 Tour of Chongming Island was the eleventh staging of the Tour of Chongming Island, a women's stage race held in Shanghai, China. It ran from 5 to 7 May 2017 and was held as part of the 2017 UCI Women's World Tour.

Teams
18 teams contested the race.

Schedule

Stages

Stage 1
5 May 2017 — Xincheng Park to Xincheng Park,

Stage 2
6 May 2017 — Xincheng Park to Xincheng Park,

Stage 3
7 May 2017 — Xincheng Park to Xincheng Park,

Classification leadership table
In the 2017 Tour of Chongming Island, five different jerseys were awarded. The most important was the general classification, which was calculated by adding each cyclist's finishing times on each stage. Time bonuses were awarded to the first three finishers on all mass-start stages: the stage winner won a ten-second bonus, with six and four seconds for the second and third riders respectively. The rider with the least accumulated time is the race leader, identified by a yellow jersey. This classification was considered the most important of the 2017 Tour of Chongming Island, and the winner of the classification was considered the winner of the race.

There was also a mountains classification, the leadership of which was marked by a polkadot jersey. In the mountains classification, points towards the classification were won by reaching the top of a climb before other cyclists. Additionally, there was a points classification, which awarded a green jersey. In the points classification, cyclists received points for finishing in the top 10 in a stage.

The fourth jersey represented the young rider classification, marked by a white jersey. This was decided the same way as the general classification, but only riders born on or after 1 January 1995 were eligible to be ranked in the classification, in line with the young rider classification of all UCI Women's World Tour events. The fifth and final jersey represented the classification for Chinese riders, marked by a blue jersey. This was decided the same way as the general classification, but only riders born in China were eligible to be ranked in the classification. There was also a team classification, in which the times of the best three cyclists per team on each stage were added together; the leading team at the end of the race was the team with the lowest total time.

References

External links
 

2017 UCI Women's World Tour
2017 in Chinese sport
2017